Kirian may refer to:
22134 Kirian, a named minor planet
Kirian Ledesma (born 1984), Spanish footballer
Kirian Rodríguez (born 1996), Spanish footballer